ChibiOS/RT is a compact and fast real-time operating system supporting multiple architectures and released under a mix of the GNU General Public License version 3 (GPL3) and the Apache License 2.0 (depending on module). It is developed by Giovanni Di Sirio. 

Commercial licenses are available from ChibiOS. Additional products include ChibiOS/HAL, a hardware abstraction layer compatible with ChibiOS/RT, and ChibiStudio, a free integrated development environment based on Eclipse, the GNU Compiler Collection, and the OpenOCD Joint Test Action Group (JTAG) debugging pod.

Metrics
ChibiOS/RT is designed for embedded applications on microcontrollers of 8-, 16-, and 32-bits. Size and execution efficiency are the main project goals. As reference, the kernel size can range from a minimum of 1.2 KiB up to a maximum of 5.5 KiB with all the subsystems activated on a STM32 Cortex-M3 processor. The kernel can achieve over 220,000 created/terminated threads per second and can perform a context switch in 1.2 microseconds on an STM32 @ 72 MHz. Similar metrics for all the supported platforms are included in the source code distribution as test reports.

Features
The ChibiOS/RT microkernel supports:

Preemptive multithreading
128 priority queue levels
Round-robin scheduling for threads at the same priority level
Software timers
Counting semaphores
Mutexes with support for the priority inheritance algorithm
Condition variables
Synchronous and asynchronous Messages
Event flags and handlers
Queues
Synchronous and asynchronous I/O with timeout capability
Thread-safe memory heap and memory pool allocators.
Hardware Abstraction Layer with support for ADC, CAN, GPT (general-purpose timer), EXT, I²C, ICU, MAC, MMC/SD, PAL, PWM, RTC, SDC, Serial, SPI, and USB drivers.
Support for the LwIP and uIP TCP/IP stacks.
Support for the FatFs file system library.

All system objects, such as threads, semaphores, timers, etc., can be created and deleted at runtime. There is no upper limit except for the available memory. To increase system reliability, the kernel architecture is entirely static, a memory allocator is not needed (but is available as an option), and there are no data structures with upper size limits like tables or arrays. The system application programming interfaces (APIs) are designed to not have error conditions such as error codes or exceptions.

The RTOS is designed for applications on embedded systems (devices) and includes demo applications for various microcontrollers:
 STMicroelectronics – STM32F1xx, STM32F2xx, STM32F3xx, STM32F4xx, STM32L1xx, STM32F0xx; STM8S208x, STM8S105x, STM8L152x; ST/Freescale SPC56x, MPC56xx
 NXP Semiconductors – LPC11xx, LPC11Uxx, LPC13xx, LPC2148
 Atmel – AT91SAM7S, AT91SAM7X, megaAVR
 Texas Instruments (TI) – MSP430x1611; TM4C123G, TM4C1294
 Microchip Technology – PIC32MX

Contributed ports are also available for the Coldfire and H8S families.

ChibiOS/RT has also been ported to the Raspberry Pi and the following device drivers have been implemented: Port (GPIO), Serial, GPT (General-Purpose Timer), I2C, SPI and PWM.

It is also possible to run the kernel in a Win32 process in a software I/O emulation mode, allowing easy application development without the need for physical hardware. An example is included for MinGW compiler.

uGFX
ChibiOS/RT is fully supported by the graphical user interface (GUI) toolkit µGFX, formerly named ChibiOS/GFX.

See also

 Comparison of open-source operating systems
 A detailed explanation of multithreading in ChibiOS/RT

References

External links

ChibiOS/RT project page and support

Real-time operating systems
Embedded operating systems
Free software operating systems
ARM operating systems
Microkernel-based operating systems
Microkernels